NGC 1433 (also known as PGC 13586) is a barred spiral galaxy with a double ring structure located in the constellation of Horologium. It is at a distance of 46 million light-years from Earth. It is a Seyfert galaxy with an active galactic nucleus. The central region of the galaxy displays intense star formation activity, with an irregular star-forming ring of 5″ (or 0.3 kpc) radius and weak radio wave emission. Star formation is also noticeable in the spiral arms but not the bar of the galaxy. NGC 1433 is being studied as part of a survey of 50 nearby galaxies known as the Legacy ExtraGalactic UV Survey (LEGUS). A jet of material flowing away from the central black hole of the galaxy extending for only 150 light-years has been found. It is the smallest molecular outflow ever observed in a galaxy beyond our own.

NGC 1433 was discovered by James Dunlop in 1826. One supernova has been observed in NGC 1433, SN 1985 P, type II with apparent magnitude 13.5 at discovery, on 10 October 1985.

NGC 1433 is member of the Dorado Group.

Gallery

References

External links 
 

1433
Horologium (constellation)
Barred spiral galaxies
Dorado Group
013586